was a Japanese daimyō of the Edo period, who ruled the Koga Domain. He served as a rōjū for Tokugawa Ienari during the Tokugawa shogunate.

References
 Bolitho, Harold. (1974). Treasures Among Men: The Fudai Daimyo in Tokugawa Japan. New Haven: Yale University Press.  ;  OCLC 185685588

See also 
Sekka Zusetu - Figure collection of snowflake

1789 births
1848 deaths
Daimyo
Rōjū
Kyoto Shoshidai